Gandhi: Behind the Mask of Divinity is a book by United States Army officer G. B. Singh. The book was written in biographical form nearly 60 years after the assassination of Mohandas Karamchand Gandhi, and challenges his image as a saintly, benevolent, and pacifistic leader of Indian independence, told through Gandhi's own writings and actions over the course of his life. The book claims that Gandhi emulated racism from the Hindu ideology of caste towards the blacks of South Africa and the Untouchables, instigated ethnic hatred against foreign communities, and, to this end, was involved in covering up the killing of American engineer William Francis Doherty.

Singh puts forward that the portrayal of Gandhi as a great leader is "the work of the Hindu propaganda machine" and Christian clergy with ulterior motives; and, furthermore, it was based on irrationality and deception which historians have failed to critically examine.

Reception 
A book containing bibliography on Mahatma Gandhi-related literature described the book to be a highly critical account which interpreted his every move as racist and was based on questionable arguments. 

Katie Violin of The Kansas City Star also criticized the book and stated that "Gandhi as a racist doesn't add up".

Professor Manfred Steger, author of Gandhi's Dilemma: Nonviolent Principles And Nationalist Power, wrote a review of the book in the December 2005 issue of The Historian. He stated that the author doesn't offer hard evidence for the first thesis in the book, the alleged "Hindu propaganda machine", and found Singh's "eagerness to accuse" without raising or answering relevant questions "deeply disturbing". At the same time, Steger said that the author offers "much better evidence" for the second thesis, Gandhi's racist attitude. He stated, "Perhaps one of the strongest sections of the book is the author's examination of pertinent primary and secondary literature revealing Gandhi's attitude toward black Africans during his two decades in South Africa". Steger noted that numerous other "balanced" critiques of Gandhi exist, such as the works by Ved Mehta, Partha Chatterjee, and Joseph Alter. In comparison, Steger concluded, that the book was a "one-sided attack" on Gandhi, without offering the larger, more complex picture of Gandhi's ethical and political engagements, thus turning it into a "strident polemic".

In his book, Gandhi's Philosophy and the Quest for Harmony, the author Anthony Parel termed Singh's book as "scurrilous", "crude bias", and "deplorable ignorance".

Political
United States Congressman Edolphus Towns called the book "definitely controversial" but worth reading to broaden perspective on Gandhi and understand the foundations of India. Towns mentioned the book in his Congressional debate during the Proceedings and Debates of 110th United States Congress (First Session).

See also 

Gandhi Under Cross Examination
Boer War
Bambatha Rebellion

References 

2004 non-fiction books
Books about Mahatma Gandhi